The Canoa Formation is a Piacenzian to Calabrian (Chapadmalalan to Uquian in the SALMA classification) geologic formation in Ecuador. The sandstones were deposited in a coastal environment.  The formation is correlated to the Charco Azul Formation of western Panama and southeastern Costa Rica.

Fossil content 
The formation has provided bivalve, gastropod, crustacean, echinoid and scaphopod fossils and vertebrates of:
 Balaenopteridae indet.
 Cetacea indet.
 Chondrichthyes indet.
 Osteichthyes indet.

See also 
 List of fossiliferous stratigraphic units in Ecuador

References

Further reading 
 G. Bianucci, C. Di Celma, W. Landini and J. Buckeridge. 2006. Palaeoecology and taphonomy of an extraordinary whale barnacle accumulation from the Plio-Pleistocene of Ecuador. Palaeogeography, Palaeoclimatology, Palaeoecology 242:326-342
 H. A. Pilsbry and A.A. Olsson. 1941. A Pliocene fauna from Western Ecuador. Proceedings of the Natural Sciences of Philadelphia 93:1-79

Geologic formations of Ecuador
Pliocene Series of South America
Pleistocene Ecuador
Neogene Ecuador
Uquian
Chapadmalalan
Sandstone formations
Beach deposits
Paleontology in Ecuador
Formations
Formations